Abd al-Haqq al-Dehlawi was an Islamic scholar.

Biography
He was born in 1551 (958 AH) in Delhi, hence the suffix Dehlavi to his name. In 1587 (996 AH), he made the pilgrimage to Mecca, where he stayed remained for the next three years studying a hadith and Sufism under various scholars. Upon his return to Delhi, he taught for half a century, and authored more than 100 works, including  a history of Medina, a biography of Prophet Muhammad, and a work on the lives of saints.

Death
He died in Delhi, in 1642 (1052 AH).
His mausoleum exists at the edge of Hauz-i-Shamsi near Qutub Minar, Mehrauli, Delhi.

Works
 Akhbar al Akhyar, 16th Century. Urdu Edition 1990.
Sharh Mishkat Shareef, known as Ashatul Lam'at 
 Perfection of Faith (Translation), Adam Publishers.
 Madarij-ul-Nabuwwah
 Tārīh-i Haqqī (The History by Haqq). General history of South Asia from the time of the Ğūrids to the 42nd year of Mughal Emperor Akbar’s reign (1005/1596-7).
 Takmeel-Ul-Iman (Farsi) - Book regarding beliefs of Suni Muslims.
 Aashoora - A book containing 16-17 pages written on the day of Aashoora
 Taeede Hanafi Mazhab - book written on Hanafi Madhab 
 Tohfa Ithna Ashari 
 Taaruf Fiqh o Tasawwuff 
 Zubdat-ul-Aasaar Talkhees Bahjat-ul-Asraar
 Sharah Fatooh Ul Ghaib 
 Milad e Rasool e Azam 
 Tareekh e Madina

See also
List of Islamic scholars

References

Bibliography
 

Hanafis
Maturidis
16th-century Persian-language writers
Historians from the Mughal Empire
People from Delhi
Mughal Empire people
17th-century Indian writers
16th-century Indian writers
16th-century jurists
17th-century jurists
1551 births
1642 deaths
17th-century Persian-language writers